Foxzami, sired 1944 was a New Zealand-bred Thoroughbred racehorse.

In November 1949 at Flemington Racecourse, Foxzami won the Melbourne Cup. He carried a weight of 8-8 (120 pounds and started at odds of 16/1 in a field of 31 runners. Ridden by Billy Fellows, he won the cup by three lengths.

References

See also
 List of Melbourne Cup winners

Racehorses bred in New Zealand
Racehorses trained in New Zealand
Melbourne Cup winners
Thoroughbred family 19-c